Paolo Borelli (born February 22, 1958, in Albano Laziale) is an Italian former professional footballer who played as a midfielder.

He played for 2 seasons (30 games, no goals) in Serie A for Roma and Catanzaro.

References

1958 births
Living people
People from Albano Laziale
Association football midfielders
Italian footballers
Serie A players
A.S. Roma players
U.S. Catanzaro 1929 players
Parma Calcio 1913 players
Spezia Calcio players
Footballers from Lazio
Sportspeople from the Metropolitan City of Rome Capital